The 1931 Virginia Cavaliers football team represented the University of Virginia during the 1931 college football season. The Cavaliers were led by first-year head coach Fred Dawson and played their home games at the newly-constructed Scott Stadium in Charlottesville, Virginia. They competed as members of the Southern Conference, finishing with a conference record of 0–5–1 and a 1–7–2 record overall.

Schedule

References

Virginia
Virginia Cavaliers football seasons
Virginia Cavaliers football